Eleri H Cousins  (b. 1987) is an archaeologist and Lecturer in Roman History at the University of Lancaster.

Biography
Cousins' undergraduate study, in Archaeology and Classics, was at Stanford University. Subsequently, she studied for a master's degree and PhD at the University of Cambridge. She was a lecturer at the University of St Andrews before moving to her current role at Lancaster in 2019. Cousins was elected as a fellow of the Society of Antiquaries of London on 17 June 2021.

Select publications
Cousins E. 2014 "Votive Objects and Ritual Practice at the King’s Spring at Bath", Theoretical Roman Archaeology Journal 0(2013) p. 52-64. 
Cousins, E. 2016. "An Imperial Image: The Bath Gorgon in Context", Britannia 47, 99–118.
Cousins, E. 2020. The Sanctuary at Bath in the Roman Empire. Cambridge University Press.

References

Women archaeologists
Fellows of the Society of Antiquaries of London
21st-century archaeologists
Living people
1987 births
Women classical scholars